The Christmas Tree Ship is the second EP by I Like Trains.  It was released on 24 November 2008.

It is an entirely instrumental concept album, based on the storm that sank the Rouse Simmons.

The Rouse Simmons was a schooner that for twenty years delivered Christmas trees to Chicago, until on the night of November 23, 1912 it was lost in a storm on Lake Michigan, with all hands and a full cargo of Christmas trees.

The five track titles relate to different aspects of the story.

 The Christmas Tree Ship is about the sinking of the Rouse Simmons itself.
 South Shore, Two Brothers and Three Sisters were the names of three other ships that sank the same night.
 Friday, Everybody Goodbye is the opening sentence of a message in a bottle thrown into the sea by the captain of the Rouse Simmons.

The album was released as a limited-edition CD and DVD, but the general release was only as an MP3 download. Since then, I Like Trains have made the album a one-track EP for download.

Track listing
 "The Christmas Tree Ship"
 "South Shore"
 "Two Brothers"	
 "Three Sisters"
 "Friday, Everybody Goodbye"

References

2008 EPs
I Like Trains albums
Beggars Banquet Records EPs
Christmas tree production